Kevin Awino (born 6 June 1997) is a  Uganda women's cricketer. 
In July 2018, she was named in Uganda's squad for the 2018 ICC Women's World Twenty20 Qualifier tournament. She was selected as the captain for the squad. In April 2019, she was named as the captain of Uganda's squad for the 2019 ICC Women's Qualifier Africa tournament in Zimbabwe.

In March 2023, Awino became one of the Ugandan Cricket Association's first twelve women players to be awarded central contracts.

References

External links
 

1997 births
Living people
Ugandan women cricketers
Uganda women Twenty20 International cricketers